Berkashat is a village in the Armavir Province of Armenia.

See also 
Armavir Province

References

Populated places in Armavir Province
Populated places established in 1928
Cities and towns built in the Soviet Union
Yazidi populated places in Armenia